Barret Ehgoetz (born April 16, 1981) is a Canadian former professional ice hockey player who is best known for playing for the Cincinnati Cyclones in the ECHL.

Awards and honours

ECHL Sportsmanship Award (2009–10)

References

External links

Living people
Cincinnati Cyclones (ECHL) players
Rochester Americans players
Utah Grizzlies (ECHL) players
1981 births
Ice hockey people from Ontario
Canadian ice hockey centres